HMS Antigua was a 14-gun sloop that served in the British Royal Navy from 1779 to 1792. In contemporary records she is sometimes referred to as "His Majesty's armed brig Antigua".

American Revolutionary War
Between 1780 and 1782 she was under the command of Lieutenant Robert Barton, and captured several prizes. 
At some point she captured the American privateer Nancy.
On 25 December 1780 she captured two Dutch ships, the Vrouw Elizabeth and Stad Workum.
On 9 August 1781 she retook the French privateer Defiance.
On 28 April 1782, Antigua and the cutter Viper brought into Waterford a French privateer lugger and her prize. The prize was a sloop that had been sailing from London to Cork with merchandise when the privateer took her.

Antigua was in service in August 1789.

Fate
Antigua was sold on 12 January 1792.

Citations

References
Colledge, J.J. Ships of the Royal Navy: The Complete Record of All Fighting Ships of the Royal Navy From the Fifteenth Century to the Present. Annapolis, Maryland: Naval Institute Press, 1987. .

Sloops of the Royal Navy